Bolton Council, also called Bolton Metropolitan Borough Council is the local authority of the Metropolitan Borough of Bolton in Greater Manchester, England. It is a Metropolitan Borough Council, one of ten in Greater Manchester and one of 36 in the Metropolitan Counties of England, and provides the majority of local government services in Bolton Metropolitan Borough.

History
The current local authority was first elected in 1973, a year before formally coming into its powers and prior to the creation of the Metropolitan Borough of Bolton on 1 April 1974. The council was created as a borough rather than a metropolitan district, entitling it to be known as Bolton Metropolitan Borough Council.

Political control

Since the 2019 election, Bolton has been under no overall control, with the Conservatives leading the council with the support of other parties. The leader of the council since August 2021 has been Martyn Cox.

Wards and councillors
There are 20 wards, each represented by three councillors.

Elected to complete the term started by David Greenhalgh, who died in office

See also
Bolton Metropolitan Borough Council elections
List of mayors of Bolton

Notes

Metropolitan district councils of England
Local authorities in Greater Manchester
Leader and cabinet executives
Local education authorities in England
Billing authorities in England
1974 establishments in England
Metropolitan Borough of Bolton